Tantramar Regional High School, is a Canadian secondary school located in Sackville, New Brunswick.

Notable alumni
Ian Hanomansing - journalist
Marc Milner - historian

References

External links
 Official School Website
 Anglophone East School District Website

High schools in New Brunswick